TEMS (Toyota Electronic Modulated Suspension) is a shock absorber that is electronically controlled (Continuous Damping Control) based on multiple factors, and was built and exclusively used by Toyota for selected products during the 1980s and 1990s (first introduced on the Toyota Soarer in 1983). The semi-active suspension system was widely used on luxury and top sport trim packages on most of Toyota’s products sold internationally. Its popularity fell after the “bubble economy” as it was seen as an unnecessary expense to purchase and maintain, and remained in use on luxury or high performance sports cars.

Summary
TEMS consisted of four shock absorbers mounted at all four wheels, and could be used in either an automatic or driver selected mode based on the installation of the system used. The technology was installed on top-level Toyota products with four wheel independent suspension, labeled PEGASUS (Precision Engineered Geometrically Advanced SUSpension). Because of the nature of the technology, TEMS was installed on vehicles with front and rear independent suspensions. Although there were TEMS equipped cars with the rear dependent suspension too – the minibuses or minivans like Toyota TownAce/MasterAce, Toyota HiAce at the top package.

Based on road conditions, the system would increase or decrease ride damping force for particular situations. The TEMS system was easily installed to suit ride comfort, and road handling stability on small suspensions, adding a level of ride modification found on larger, more expensive luxury vehicles. The technology was originally developed and calibrated for Japanese driving conditions due to Japanese speed limits, but was adapted for international driving conditions with later revisions.

As the Japanese recession of the early 1990s began to take effect, the system was seen as an unnecessary expense as buyers were less inclined to purchase products and services seen as “luxury” and more focused on basic needs. TEMS installation was still achieved on vehicles that were considered luxurious, like the Toyota Crown, Toyota Century, Toyota Windom, and the Toyota Supra and Toyota Soarer sports cars.

Recently the technology has been installed on luxury minivans like the Toyota Alphard, Toyota Noah and the Toyota Voxy.

The TEMS system has been recently named “Piezo TEMS” (with piezoelectric ceramics), “Skyhook TEMS” “Infinity TEMS” and more recently “AVS” (Adaptive Variable Suspension).

Configuration settings
The system was deployed with an earlier two-stage switch labeled “Auto-Sport”, with a later modification of “Auto-Soft-Mid-Hard”. Some variations used a dial to specifically select the level of hardness to the driver’s desires. For most driving situations, the “Auto” selection was recommended. When the system was activated, an indicator light reflected the suspension setting selected.
The system components consisted of a control switch, indicator light, four shock absorbers, shock absorber control actuator, shock absorber control computer, vehicle speed sensor, stop lamp switch, with a throttle position sensor and a steering angle sensor  on TEMS three stage systems only. All the absorbers are controlled with the same level of hardness.

Operation parameters of TEMS
The following describes how the system would activate on the earlier version installed during the 1980s on two stage TEMS
During normal running 
The system chooses the "SOFT" selection, to provide a softer ride.
At high speeds 
The system selects the "HARD" selection and determines that at high speeds, it assumes a more rigid configuration for better ride stability, and to reduce roll tendencies.
Braking  (reducing speed to )
In order to prevent “nose dive”, the process proceeds to "HARD" automatically damping force until it senses the brakes to be at the"SOFT" setting. It will return to the "SOFT" state when the brake light is off, and the pedal has been released after 2 seconds or more.
(Only 3-stage systems) during hard acceleration
To suppress suspension “squat” the system switches to "HARD" based on accelerator pedal position and throttle position.
(Only 3-stage systems) during hard cornering
To suppress suspension “roll” the system switches to "HARD" based on steering angle sensor position.
SPORT mode
The system remains in the "HARD" position regardless of driving conditions. (For 3-stage systems, the system automatically chooses between the “MID” and the "HARD" configurations - by the other words, the "SOFT" stage is excepted)

Vehicles installed
The following is a list of vehicles in Japan that were installed with the technology. There may have been vehicles exported internationally that were also equipped.

Starlet (EP71-based Turbo S, EP82-based GT)
Tercel / Corsa / Corolla II (EL31-based GP turbo)
Cynos
Sera
Corolla / Sprinter (AE92 series GT)
Corolla Levin / Sprinter Trueno (AE92 • AE101GT-APEX)
Corolla FX (AE92-GT)
Corona (ST171-based GT-R)
Celica / Carina ED / Corona EXiV (ST183 system)
Century
Crown Majesta 
Camry / Vista (SV20-based GT and Prominent G, SV30-based GT)
Pronard
Aristo (S140)
Town Ace / Master Ace
Lite Ace
Mark II / Chaser / Cresta (GX71-based Twin Cam Grande, GX81-based Twin Cam Grande system, JZX91 Grande G, JZX100 Grande G, JZX101 Grande G, JZX110 Grande G)
Windom (MCV10 system G, MCV20 system G, MCV30 system G)
Hiace
Hilux Surf (KZN130)
Hilux Surf (KZN185))
Crown
Soarer (GZ20 system 2.0GT Twin turbo L, JZZ30 system 2.5GT twin turbo L)
Soarer (1UZ-FE V8 UZZ31).
Supra (Select Models)
Celsior: Piezo TEMS
Noah / Voxy
Alphard
Land Cruiser (100 series)
Ipsum (acm20 system)

See also

Active Stabilizer Suspension System
Kinetic Dynamic Suspension System
Toyota Active Control Suspension
Active Body Control

References
Notes

Sources
 Development of New Toyota Electronic Modulated Suspension - Two Concepts for Semi-Active Suspension Control

Toyota
Automotive suspension technologies
Automotive technology tradenames
Automotive safety technologies
Auto parts
Mechanical power control